Campiglossa loewiana is a species of fly in the family Tephritidae, the gall flies. The species is found in the Palearctic. The larvae feed in flower heads of Solidago virgaurea and Aster amellus.

References

Tephritinae
Insects described in 1927
Diptera of Europe